Mount Davis may refer to:

Places

United States 

Mount Davis (Yavapai County, Arizona), near Mount Union
Mount Davis (California)

Mount Davis (New Hampshire)
Mount Davis (Pennsylvania), highest point in Pennsylvania

Elsewhere
Mount Davis (Antarctica)
Mount Davis (British Columbia), Canada
Mount Davis, Hong Kong, a hill in Kennedy Town, Hong Kong Island

Other uses 
Mount Davis (Oakland), a section of seats at the Oakland Coliseum in Oakland, California

See also 
Davis Mountains, Texas
Davis Peak (disambiguation)